Hunderfossen Familiepark is an amusement park north of Lillehammer in the province of Oppland in Norway.

The park is one of Norway's biggest tourist attractions, with over 275,000 visitors each summer. It also has a Winter Park which opens from February to mid-March. The park was founded in 1984, and currently has more than 60 attractions.

Many of the rides and attractions are themed after or inspired by Norwegian folktales by Peter Christen Asbjørnsen and Jørgen Moe. 

The park was featured in an episode of the Netflix original series Lilyhammer (Season 1, Episode 8: "Trolls").

References

External links
 Official website
 The Winter park

Culture in Oppland
Amusement parks in Norway
Buildings and structures in Lillehammer
1984 establishments in Norway
Tourist attractions in Oppland
Amusement parks opened in 1984